Hiligaynon may refer to:
 Hiligaynon people, also known as Ilonggo people, a subgroup of the Visayan ethnic group native to Panay, Guimaras, Negros and South-Central Mindanao. Not to be confused with the demonym Ilonggo which pertains to the permanent residents of Iloilo province and Iloilo City regardless of ethnicity.
 Hiligaynon language, also known as Ilonggo language, the language of the Hiligaynon people
 Hiligaynon literature, also known as Ilonggo literature
 Hiligaynon (magazine), a Philippine weekly magazine written in the eponymous language

Language and nationality disambiguation pages